Snowflower or snow flower may refer to:

 Sarcodes sanguinea, a North American parasitic plant
 Spathiphyllum floribundum, a South American flowering plant
 Snow Flower (TV series), a 2006–07 South Korean television show
 Snow Flower (film), a 2019 Japanese romance film
 Snow Flower and the Secret Fan, a 2005 novel by Lisa See
 "Yuki no Hana", or "Snow Flower", a 2003 song by Mika Nakashima